Jackson County is the northeasternmost county in the U.S. state of Alabama. As of the 2020 census, the population was 52,579. The county seat is Scottsboro. The county was named for Andrew Jackson, general in the United States Army and afterward President of the United States of America. Jackson County is a prohibition or dry county, but three cities within the county (Bridgeport, Scottsboro, and Stevenson) are "wet", allowing alcohol sales. Jackson County comprises the Scottsboro, AL Micropolitan Statistical Area, And Jackson county is included in the Scottsboro-Fort Payne combined statistical areas. It is the site of Russell Cave National Monument, an archeological site with evidence of 8,000 years of human occupation in the Southeast.

History
Jackson County was established on December 13, 1819, after the federal government arranged a treaty to remove the Cherokee from the area and extinguish their land claims. The hilly and mountainous terrain of the Appalachians made the area unsuitable for the plantation-style agriculture of the lowlands and coastal area. It was settled largely by families from Tennessee, South Carolina, and Georgia.

This area was developed largely for subsistence farming, and few families held any slaves. For instance, in 1860, Bellefonte, Alabama, then the county seat and largest community in the county, had a population of 181, of whom eight were free blacks and the remainder were white. No slaves were recorded in that community.

The county is crossed by a number of rivers and waterways; the most important is the Tennessee River, which drains most of the county. The current county seat of Scottsboro developed along the river, and was also the site of a railroad station when railroads reached the area. Hydroelectric power was developed in the first quarter of the 20th century to generate energy for industry. By the mid-20th century, industry had replaced agriculture as the most important element of the economy.

Geography

It is the fifth-largest county in Alabama by total area. Much of it is located in the Appalachians.

Of special interest is Russell Cave National Monument, which is located in Doran Cove, approximately 5 miles west of the town of Bridgeport. It is believed to offer "one of the most complete records of prehistoric culture in the southeast United States." Russell Cave was declared a National Monument in May 1961 by President John F. Kennedy.

The cave is an important archaeological site that was excavated in 1956 by the Smithsonian Institution and the National Geographic Society. The  October 1956 issue of National Geographic Magazine featured an article reporting, "Life 8,000 Years Ago Uncovered in an Alabama Cave." Evidence was found of human occupation of the cave from 6200 B.C. to A.D. 1650. The article was written by Carl F. Miller, the expedition leader. There have been follow-up studies about this site.

Adjacent counties
Marion County, Tennessee – northeast
Dade County, Georgia – east (EST)
DeKalb County – southeast
Marshall County – southwest
Madison County – west
Franklin County, Tennessee – northwest

National protected areas
 Fern Cave National Wildlife Refuge
 Russell Cave National Monument
 Sauta Cave National Wildlife Refuge

Demographics

2000 census
As of the census of 2000, there were 53,926 people, 21,615 households, and 15,822 families residing in the county.  The population density was 50 people per square mile (19/km2).  There were 24,168 housing units at an average density of 22 per square mile (9/km2).  The racial makeup of the county was 91.89% White (non-Hispanic), 3.74% Black or African American, 1.75% Native American, 0.23% Asian, 0.02% Pacific Islander, 0.36% from other races, and 2.00% from two or more races.  1.61% of the population were Hispanic or Latino of any race.

In 2000, the largest ancestry groups in Jackson County were English 69.1%, Scots-Irish 5.21%, Scottish 4.67%, and African 3.74%.

2010
According to the 2010 United States census:

92.6% White (non-Hispanic)
2.1% Black
1.4% Native American
0.61% Asian
0.0% Native Hawaiian or Pacific Islander
1.5% Two or more races
1.4% Hispanic or Latino (of any race)

There were 21,615 households, out of which 31.50% had children under the age of 18 living with them, 59.00% were married couples living together, 10.50% had a female householder with no husband present, and 26.80% were non-families. Nearly 24.30% of all households were made up of individuals, and 10.50% had someone living alone who was 65 years of age or older.  The average household size was 2.47, and the average family size was 2.92.

In the county, the population was spread out, with 24.20% under the age of 18, 8.30% from 18 to 24, 28.70% from 25 to 44, 25.40% from 45 to 64, and 13.40% who were 65 years of age or older.  The median age was 38 years. For every 100 females, there were 95.10 males.  For every 100 females age 18 and over, there were 92.00 males.

The median income for a household in the county was $32,020, and the median income for a family was $38,082. Males had a median income of $29,777 versus $20,990 for females. The per capita income for the county was $16,000.  About 10.30% of families and 13.70% of the population were below the poverty line, including 17.20% of those under age 18 and 21.00% of those age 65 or over.

2020 census

As of the 2020 United States census, there were 52,579 people, 20,695 households, and 14,456 families residing in the county.

Politics
While most of North Alabama became solidly Republican during the 1970s, Jackson County remained a stronghold of the Democratic Party for elections to local office up through the 2000s (residents are not usually liberal, however; see Dixiecrat and Southern Democrat). Until November 2012, Democrats were elected to Jackson County government. In that year's general election, two Republicans were elected to the Jackson County Commission—the first Republicans to serve on the Commission since Reconstruction.

There is now an all-Republican political delegation in Jackson County. Tommy Hanes and Ritchie Whorton represent the county in the Alabama House of Representatives. Steve Livingston serves Jackson County in the Alabama State Senate. In 2004, Jackson County voted for Republican George W. Bush over Democrat John Kerry. It was the first time Jackson County voters had chosen a Republican presidential candidate over a Democrat since 1972.

In 2008, Republican presidential nominee John McCain won the county with 67.7 percent of the vote. In 2010, Republican gubernatorial candidate Robert J. Bentley received 56% of the vote, Republican House candidate Mo Brooks received 55% of the vote, and incumbent Senator Richard Shelby received 70% in the county. However, Democratic politicians continued to be elected to local positions such as County Sheriff and the school board.

The current Jackson County Commission is headed by Chairman General Willie Nance Jr.

Transportation

Major highways

 U.S. Highway 72
 State Route 35
 State Route 40
 State Route 65
 State Route 71
 State Route 73
 State Route 79
 State Route 117
 State Route 146
 State Route 277
 State Route 279

Rail
CSX Transportation
Norfolk Southern Railway
Sequatchie Valley Railroad

Communities

Cities
 Bridgeport
 Scottsboro (county seat)
 Stevenson

Towns

 Dutton
 Hollywood
 Hytop
 Langston
 Paint Rock
 Pisgah
 Pleasant Groves
 Section
 Skyline
 Woodville

Unincorporated communities

 Baileytown
 Bass
 Bolivar
 Bryant
 Card Switch
 Estillfork
 Fackler
 Flat Rock
 Francisco
 Gorham's Bluff
 Higdon
 Hollytree
 Larkin
 Larkinsville
 Liberty Hill
 Lim Rock
 Long Island
 Pikeville
 Princeton
 Rash
 Rosalie
 Swaim
 Trenton

Ghost towns
 Bellefonte
 Little Nashville

See also
National Register of Historic Places listings in Jackson County, Alabama
Properties on the Alabama Register of Landmarks and Heritage in Jackson County, Alabama

References

Further reading
 The Heritage of Jackson County, Alabama, Clanton, Ala.: Heritage Publishing Consultants, 1998.
 Kennamer, John Robert. The History of Jackson County, Alabama, Scottsboro, Ala.: Jackson County Historical Association, 1993.

External links

 Jackson County Economic Development Authority
 Jackson County Historical Society
 Jackson County Chamber of Commerce
 Jackson County map of roads/towns
 Jackson County Sheriff's Office
 

 
1819 establishments in Alabama
Populated places established in 1819
Huntsville-Decatur, AL Combined Statistical Area
Counties of Appalachia